Birdie Kim (Korean 김주연) (born Ju-Yun Kim 26 August 1981, in Iksan) is a South Korean professional golfer. Her career highlight is winning the 2005 U.S. Women's Open at Cherry Hills Country Club. In the last round, she was tied for the lead on the 18th hole with amateurs Morgan Pressel and Brittany Lang. Her second shot found a green-side bunker. She holed out from the bunker to take the lead and ultimately won by two strokes.

Kim won the 1998–99 Korea Junior Championship. She turned professional in November 2000 and joined the Futures Tour, which is the second-tier women's golf tour in the United States, in 2001. Her rookie season on the main LPGA Tour was 2004, and was not successful as she only made three cuts in 20 events, but she retained her tour card by finishing tied 12th at the Qualifying School. She did somewhat better in early 2005, and picked up her first top ten finish that May, but her victory at the U.S. Women's Open was totally unexpected.

She changed her first name to Birdie in 2004, in an effort to distinguish herself from the numerous other Korean golfers named Kim in the women's golf world in the minds of non-Koreans. Kim is a common surname in Korea, especially on the LPGA Tour.

In 2005, Kim earned a total of $715,006 and came in 13th for LPGA season money position. She married fellow pro golfer Bae Kyu Lee in December 2007.

A 2009 car accident derailed Kim's career and she had trouble making cuts on the LPGA. In 2012, she played in 12 events on the Symetra Tour, finishing second on the money list. Kim last played an LPGA-sanctioned event in 2015. Like Janet Alex in 1982 and Hilary Lunke in 2003, the U.S. Open was her only LPGA Tour win.

Professional wins

LPGA Tour wins (1)

Futures Tour wins
2001 Chumash Casino Futures Classic, Southwestern Bell Futures Classic
2003 Bank of Ann Arbor Futures Classic

Major championships

Wins (1)

Results timeline
Results not in chronological order before 2015.

^ The Evian Championship was added as a major in 2013.

CUT = missed the half-way cut
"T" = tied

Summary
Starts – 26
Wins – 1
2nd place finishes – 0
3rd place finishes – 0
Top 3 finishes – 1
Top 5 finishes – 1
Top 10 finishes – 1
Top 25 finishes – 3
Missed cuts – 20
Most consecutive cuts made – 2 (thrice)
Longest streak of top-10s – 1

Team appearances
Professional
Lexus Cup (representing Asia team): 2005

References

External links

South Korean female golfers
LPGA Tour golfers
Winners of LPGA major golf championships
Asian Games medalists in golf
Asian Games silver medalists for South Korea
Golfers at the 1998 Asian Games
Medalists at the 1998 Asian Games
Sportspeople from North Jeolla Province
South Korean Buddhists
1981 births
Living people